The Taiwan thrush (Turdus niveiceps) is a bird in the thrush family. It is endemic to the island of Taiwan.

Taxonomy
It was formerly considered a subspecies of the island thrush (T. poliocephalus), but genetic studies indicate that it is not closely related, and it displays some characteristics such as heavy sexual dimorphism not known from any other island thrush subspecies. It was reclassified as a distinct species by the IOC in 2021.

Description
The male Taiwan thrush has black upperparts except for a white head and throat.  The underparts are mainly dark orange with a blackish upper breast.  The female has similar patterning but is duller, with a brown back, grayish brown head with a white streak behind the eye, buff throat and upper breast streaked brown, and with duller orange underparts.  Its bill, legs and feet are yellow.  Males and females are similar in size, about 22 cm in length.

Distribution and habitat
The species is a rare resident of central Taiwan's mountain forests at altitudes of 1800–2500 m.

Behaviour

Feeding
The Taiwan thrush forages through trees, low vegetation, and on the ground in leaf litter.  Its diet includes a variety of invertebrates as well as seeds, berries and fruit.

See also
List of protected species in Taiwan
List of endemic species of Taiwan
List of endemic birds of Taiwan

References

Taiwan thrush
Endemic birds of Taiwan
Taiwan thrush
Taiwan thrush